Jason Wallace (born 1969) is an author living in South West London. He is the author of Out of Shadows, the 2010 Costa Children's Book of the Year.

Early life and education
Wallace was born in Cheltenham, Gloucestershire, South West England. He is a descendant of Lord George Sanger, a world-famous Victorian circus owner, an International English cricketer, and he is also loosely related (through a marriage in the family tree) to J.R.R. Tolkien. Jason lived in London, England in his younger years with his family before residing and attending Peterhouse Boys' School, a boarding school in 1983 in Zimbabwe, Africa. The family emigrated after his mother remarried. At the age of seventeen he aspired for a career as an author and although determined he knew it would be a challenging ambition. Jason spent any free time he had writing  and in his younger years he read many non-fiction books  and comic books .

He was a fan of comic books such as The Adventures of Tintin and Asterix and authors including Dr.Seuss and Richard Scarry. In his childhood, among some of his favorite books were James and the Giant Peach and Danny the Champion of the World. In his adolescent and adult life, he was a fan of Stephen King and James Herbert. Ironically, his least favorite types of literature were history and politics - something he now enjoys reading in great quantities.

His experiences in a Zimbabwean boarding school following the Zimbabwe War of Liberation / Rhodesian Bush War laid the building blocks of his first and Costa Children's Book Award winning novel Out of Shadows.

Career
Jason Wallace had a challenging journey to becoming a published author. Jason Wallace stated that "getting published didn't happen overnight, and writing had to become "the other job" for which I didn't get paid while life continued." Jason Wallace's natural talent as a writer was motivated through education. He says he has "always had a fertile imagination, but as far as I'm concerned, it's the school I need to thank for inadvertently nurturing my will to write through strong discipline (there was no such thing as an excuse.

Out of Shadows

Out of Shadows was published on January 28, 2010 by Andersen Press. The novel has received extensive recognition (international rights currently sold to the USA, Norway, Turkey, Brazil and France) and has established him as a successful published author.

Out of Shadows took one year and six months to complete. While he attended a boarding school in Zimbabwe not too long after the Rhodesian Bush War/Zimbabwean War of Liberation ended, Jason Wallace wanted to write a story of what he had seen or experienced. The political scene in Zimbabwe was declining and troubled. This inspired Jason Wallace, and he began writing fictional stories of what he was encountering. Though the characters in the novel are not real, they served to demonstrate the attitudes or personalities "a very few people" were portraying. Wallace notes that he "came up with the idea of "What if...?" and took it from there" when he was writing Out of Shadows. There may be many similar aspects that his story may share with real life but they are very general details, and there is nothing very specific.

Out of Shadows is set Zimbabwe during the 1980s and is historically accurate due to the experiences Wallace shared in the novel. It is set after the war when Robert Mugabe has come to power offering hope, land and freedom to black Africans. It is the end of the Old Way and the start of a promising new era. For Robert Jacklin, it's all new: new continent, new country, new school. And very quickly he is forced to understand a new way of thinking, because for some of his classmates the sound of guns is still loud, and their battles rage on... white boys who want their old country back, not this new black African government. Boys like Ivan. Clever, cunning, wicked Ivan. For him, there is still one last battle to fight, and he's taking it right to the very top..."

Wallace focused on several themes in the novel Out of Shadows such as bullying, racism, politics and morality. The book is cross-over novel, written for both adults and a younger audience of 13+ due to some difficult topics that are being dealt with.

Encounters
Jason Wallace's second novel, Encounters, was published on May 4, 2017 by Andersen Press. The novel is also set in Zimbabwe but is very different from Out of Shadows. It was inspired by true events in the 1990s.

Personal life
Wallace currently resides in South West London, England.

Bibliography
 Out of Shadows (2010)
 Encounters (2017)

Awards
WINNER - Costa Children's Book of the Year 2010 - Costa Book Awards - "...a unanimous winner... A stunning debut novel without a false note. Accomplished and powerful, it changes the way you think."
WINNER - the Branford Boase Award 2011 - Branford Boase Awards 
WINNER - the UKLA Children's Book Award 2011 - UKLA 
Shortlisted for the CILIP Carnegie Medal 2011 - The CILIP Carnegie Children's Book Awards 
Shortlisted for the Booktrust Teenage Prize 2010 - Booktrust

References

External links

 Jason Wallace at Library of Congress Authorities — with 2 catalogue records

1969 births
Living people
Alumni of Peterhouse Boys' School
English children's writers
Web designers
Writers from London
British emigrants to Zimbabwe
21st-century British novelists
Costa Book Award winners
People from Cheltenham